Cercomacroides is a genus of passerine birds in the family Thamnophilidae.

The genus contains six species:
 Willis's antbird (Cercomacroides laeta)
 Parker's antbird (Cercomacroides parkeri)
 Blackish antbird (Cercomacroides nigrescens)
 Riparian antbird (Cercomacroides fuscicauda)
 Dusky antbird (Cercomacroides tyrannina)
 Black antbird (Cercomacroides serva)

These species were formerly placed in the genus Cercomacra. A molecular phylogenetic study published in 2014 found that Cercomacra, as then defined, was polyphyletic. The genus was split to create monophyletic genera and six species were moved to the newly erected genus Cercomacroides with the dusky antbird as the type species.

References

 
Bird genera